The Quadrangular Mardakan Fortress or the Great Mardakan Castle ( or ) is a historical and architectural monument located in the Mardakan settlement of the Khazar district in Baku. It is included by the Ministry of Culture and Tourism of Azerbaijan (currently - the Ministry of Culture of Azerbaijan) in the list of monuments of world importance. In 2001, along with other objects of the coastal defence of the Caspian Sea, it was included in the UNESCO World Heritage Reserve List.

The fortress was built in the shape of a quadrangle in the 12th century by Akhsitan I, the son of Shirvanshah Minuchihr III.

The courtyard of the castle has the dimensions of 24x20 meters, and the height of the tower located in the courtyard is of 22 meters. The outer walls of the castle are reinforced with semi-circular blind towers located at the corners and along the wall. In general, the donjon of the Quadrangular Mardakan Castle has more developed architectural features compared to the Round Mardakan Castle.

History

The Great Mardakan Castle was built in 1187-1188 at the order of the Shirvanshah Akhsitan I. At various times, the fortress, built in the honour of the brilliant victory of Akhsitan over the enemy, was used as a defensive structure, as an observation post and as a castle.

Architectural features
The courtyard of the castle has the dimensions of 24x20 meters, and the height of the tower located in the courtyard is of 22 meters. According to L. Mamikonov, such an impressive height of the tower makes possible to fire from the platform on its top not only the castle's courtyard, but also the territory outside the outer walls of the fortress.  The outer walls of the castle are reinforced with semi-circular blind towers located at the corners and along the wall. The distance between the towers does not exceed 10-11 meters, and this differs from the generally accepted distance in the construction of the defensive structures until the 14th century. Probably, intending to protect the areas adjacent to the outer walls of the castle with crossfire, the architect decided to reduce the distance between the towers.

The entrance gate, located in the middle of one of the fortress walls, is protected on the both sides by well-fortified semi-circular towers. The courtyard of the Great Mardakan Castle is planned in such a way that the enemy, breaking through the first line of castle's defence and entering the courtyard, falls into a narrow corridor of 5 meters wide between the donjon and the castle wall, a fact which makes him an easy target for the defenders located on the platform at the top of the tower.

Generally, the donjon of the Quadrangular Mardakan Castle has more developed architectural features compared to the Round Mardakan Castle. In contrast to the three-tiered form characteristic to the round donjons, the inner space of the square donjon of the Great Mardakan Castle is divided into five tiers.

Among the donjon's tiers, only the first and the last one have a stone roof being designed in the form of a vaulted ceiling. The ceilings of the remaining tiers are flat being made on the basis of wooden beams.

The extension to the four sides of the donjon semi-circular towers, on the one hand, influenced its architectural features and gave it a more durable character which made possible to increase the height of the building, and on the other hand, created conditions for a more effective organization of the tower walls' defence.

See also
Round Tower (Mardakan) 
Mardakan
Architecture of Azerbaijan

References

Buildings and structures in Baku
Castles and fortresses in Azerbaijan
Buildings and structures completed in the 14th century
Monuments and memorials in Azerbaijan
Tourist attractions in Azerbaijan